The following is a list of events relating to television in Ireland from 1974.

Events

May – In its long-awaited report, the Broadcasting Review Committee endorses a second television channel for Ireland.
Undated – The limit on the number of households that can be connected to high-specification aerial is abolished. Furthermore, it is agreed that RTÉ will receive a percentage of gross rental income from television aerial contractors by way of compensation for the estimated loss of advertising revenue RTÉ will experience due to competition with other television stations.
Undated – The cable television company RTÉ Relays Ltd (later Cablelink) is established.

Ongoing television programmes
RTÉ News: Nine O'Clock (1961–present)
RTÉ News: Six One (1962–present)
The Late Late Show (1962–present)
The Riordans (1965–1979)
Quicksilver (1965–1981)
Seven Days (1966–1976)
Wanderly Wagon (1967–1982)
Hall's Pictorial Weekly (1971–1980)
Sports Stadium (1973–1997)

Births
18 April – Lorraine Pilkington, actress
1 October – Keith Duffy, singer-songwriter, actor, drummer, dancer and television presenter
Undated – Victoria Smurfit, actress

See also
1974 in Ireland

References

 
1970s in Irish television